Helena de Moraes Salles (July 8, 1919 – June 1, 2011) was an Olympic freestyle swimmer from Brazil, who participated at one Summer Olympics for her native country.

At the 1936 Summer Olympics in Berlin, she swam the 100-metre freestyle, not reaching the finals. Salles died in 2011 at the age of 91.

References

1919 births
2011 deaths
Olympic swimmers of Brazil
Swimmers at the 1936 Summer Olympics
Brazilian female freestyle swimmers